Edoardo Casciano (9 January 1936 – 22 October 1997) was an Italian sports shooter. He competed in the trap event at the 1960 Summer Olympics.

References

External links
 

1936 births
1997 deaths
Italian male sport shooters
Olympic shooters of Italy
Shooters at the 1960 Summer Olympics
Sportspeople from Rome
20th-century Italian people